Santa Justa Klan was a Spanish band that emerged from the TV show Los Serrano. It was formed by several of the actors in the series: Víctor Elías, Natalia Sánchez, Adrián Rodríguez and Andrés de la Cruz. The target audience was children who had sent in letters referring to the sometimes troubling situations which occur in school between boys and girls. In the series, the leader of the group is Guille (Elías). From their first album they released two singles: "A Toda Mecha", which launched them to fame, and "Del 1 al 10 (From One to Ten)".

History
In 2006 they released their second studio album, "DPM" on the Dro Atlantic label, which followed the lines of the first album, talking about issues that occurred at school. Their first single was "Con Angelina Jollie me va la olla" and the second one was "Como toques mi bocadillo te muerdo (Boliche's anthem)". On August 2, a presentation tour of the album began in Ibiza but finally the group disbanded in 2007 due to the limited success of this second album.

Group members
Víctor Elías
Natalia Sánchez
Adrián Rodríguez
Andrés de la Cruz

Discography

SJK (2005)
A toda mecha
Adiós papá
Soy la caña
Yo paso del amor
Del 1 al 10
Metrosexual
Me pica
Nadie manda
La profesora de inglés
Pienso en ti constantemente
Estoy pá' alla
Me piro

DPM (2006)
 Con Angelina Jolie se me va la olla
 D.P.M.
 Bésame
 Después del tono
 Primero lo primero
 Entre muñecas
 Primer encuentro
 Ke te pires
 Paso de ti
 Quiero despegar
 Outro (Boliche's anthem)

Spanish pop music groups
Musical groups from Madrid